Alexander Henderson was a Scottish professional footballer who played in the Scottish League for East Stirlingshire, Falkirk and Dumbarton as a left back.

Personal life 
Henderson served as a lance corporal in McCrae's Battalion of the Royal Scots during the First World War. He was wounded during the course of his service.

Career statistics

Honours 
Falkirk

 Stirlingshire Consolation Cup: 1912–13
 Dewar Shield: 1913–14
 Falkirk District Charity Cup: 1913–14
 Falkirk Infirmary Shield: 1913–14, 1914–15

References 

Scottish footballers
Royal Scots soldiers
Scottish Football League players
McCrae's Battalion
Place of birth missing
British Army personnel of World War I
Year of birth missing
Year of death missing
Place of death missing
Falkirk F.C. players
Association football fullbacks
Association football wing halves
East Stirlingshire F.C. players
Alloa Athletic F.C. players
Dumbarton F.C. players